Vertex is a call centre operator that also offers a variety of other business process outsourcing (BPO) and customer management outsourcing services. 
Originally the back office service function inside UK utility company United Utilities, Vertex was spun out as a separate company in 1996.  In 2007, United Utilities sold Vertex to a consortium of investors (Oak Hill Capital, GenNx360, Knox Lawrence International) for £217m.

Vertex services include:

Business process outsourcing
Customer Management
Finance & Accounting
HR Outsourcing
Software
Offshoring
Debt Management
Telecom

References

Outsourcing companies
Business process outsourcing companies of the United Kingdom